Far Hills Country Day School (FHCDS) is a private, co-educational Preschool-Grade 8 school located in Far Hills, New Jersey. The school is situated on 54 acres that include learning gardens, computer labs, media centers, a performing arts center, a large athletics center including a climbing wall, outdoor fields, tennis courts, ropes challenge course, meadows, a pond, and woodlands.

Academics
The school's curriculum provides an education in English literature, English language, mathematics, science, and Latin. Far Hills Country Day School challenges students to cerebrate independently and achieve confidently. The school’s shared growth mindset contributes to its experiential, student-centered approach to learning, its welcoming community of families, and its focus on developing individual strengths.

Athletics
All students participate in physical education between pre-kindergarten and fourth grade and in the interscholastic athletics program between fifth and eighth grade. The athletic program includes basketball, cross-country, cross-fit, fencing, field hockey, ice hockey, lacrosse, soccer, tennis, track, and volleyball.

While the fifth grade participates in some sports, they do not compete against other schools.

Testing assessments
ERB Testing begins in third through eighth grade to benchmark students’ academic progress against other independent school students. In fourth and seventh grade, the Writing Assessment Program is used to provide a comprehensive and direct analysis of students' writing ability benchmarked against other independent school students. Upper School Students also take the SSAT, a standardized test used for secondary independent school admissions.

Popular culture
When alumna Christine Todd Whitman appeared on Celebrity Jeopardy! in 2004, one of the beneficiaries was Far Hills Country Day School.

Notable alumni
Nicholas F. Brady (born 1930), former United States Secretary of the Treasury who also briefly represented New Jersey in the United States Senate.
Steve Forbes (born 1947), editor-in-chief of Forbes.
Christine Todd Whitman (born 1947), former Governor of New Jersey.
Frederica von Stade (born 1945), Mezzo-Soprano.

References

External links
School website
Data for Far Hills Country Day School, National Center for Education Statistics

Far Hills, New Jersey
Schools in Somerset County, New Jersey
Educational institutions established in 1929
Private elementary schools in New Jersey
Private middle schools in New Jersey
New Jersey Association of Independent Schools
1929 establishments in New Jersey